Copula may refer to:
 Copula (linguistics), a word used to link subject and predicate
 Copula (music), a type of polyphonic texture similar to organum
 Copula (probability theory), a function linking marginal variables into a multivariate distribution
 Copula (cnidarian), a genus of box jellyfish
 Beatmania IIDX 23: Copula, a video game

See also
 Copula linguae, an embryonic structure of the tongue
 Copulas in signal processing
 Copulation (zoology)
 Cupola, an architectural term
 Cupola furnace, a foundry device
 Cupula (disambiguation)
 Cupule (disambiguation)
 Indo-European copula
 Romance copula